is Rimi Natsukawa's fourth original album, released on .

Background

"Ayakaji no Ne" was Natsukawa's first album after her first greatest hits album, "Rimi Natsukawa Single Collection Vol. 1".

Collaborations

Much like "Kaze no Michi" before it, the album centres on original songs composed by high-profile artists. "Sagaribana" was written by Hitoshi Uechi of Begin, "Sayōnara Arigatō" was written by Kentarō Kobuchi of Kobukuro, "Shinobu Hana" by Kazufumi Miyazawa of The Boom, "Kokoro Tsutae" by singer-songwriter Shinji Tanimura and "Chiharu-zaka" by Okinawan singer-songwriter Yasukatsu Ōjima.

Many of the songs were in collaboration with artists previously worked with. "Shimadachi" was written by Tetsuya Murakami of The Gospellers (Natsukawa collaborated with Gospellers members Yutaka Yasuoka and Kaoru Kurosawa on her former album "Kaze no Michi"). "Tamachiyu no Ashibi" was written in collaboration with Parsha Club guitarist Masaaki Uechi ("Tsuki no Niji" on Kaze no Michi was written by him also).

"Koi Uta" had its lyrics written by Ryoko Moriyama, and "Unai-jima" had lyrics by Misako Koja (Natsukawa covered their songs "Nada Sōsō"/"Dare ni mo Ienai Kedo" and "Warabigami"/"Kui nu Hajimi" respectively).

"Ai no Chikara" was a collaboration between two famous Okinawan singers, lyrics by Mamoru Miyagi and music by Johnny Ginowan.

"Tokotowa no Uta" was written by Chikuzen Sato (leader of band Sing Like Talking) and Departures' screenwriter Kundō Koyama.

Track listing

Japan sales rankings

References

Rimi Natsukawa albums
2005 albums
Victor Entertainment albums